Selçuk Uluergüven (1 January 1941 – 8 January 2014) was a Turkish actor.

Career
In 1962, Seçuk Uluergüven began his theatre career at Meydan Stage in Ankara. In the following years, he acted on stage at Ankara Sanat Theatre, Dormen Theatre, Theatre TÖS, Halk Oyuncuları Theatre and Sanatevi. He appeared also in many movies and television series. For his role as "Davut Usta" in the dramatic comedy TV series Bizimkiler, he gained wide popularity. Uluergüven was also the art director of Bahariye Art Center in Kadıköy district of Istanbul.

Between 1998 and 2002, he served as municipal councillor in Kadıköy.

Death
Uluergüven died on 8 January 2014, aged 73, at the Adnan Menderes University Hospital in Aydın. He had been in the hospital for the three months leading up to his death to receive treatment for a dislocated femoral prosthesis. He was survived by his wife, Türkan Uluergüven (64), his son Emre and granddaughter Arya Sanat (5).

His corpse was transferred to Istanbul following his last will. After a memorial service at the Caddebostan Cultural Center and the religious funeral at Şakirin Mosque on 10 January, he was laid to rest at the Zincirlikuyu Cemetery next to the grave of his son Eren, who died at the age of 21 following an accident on theatre stage in 2004.

Acting

Theatre plays

Movies

 2 X 2 = 5 - 1974 
 Güllü Geliyor Güllü - 1973

Television series

References

External links
 Selçuk Uluergüven at SinemaTürk website

1941 births
2014 deaths
Male actors from Istanbul
Turkish male film actors
Turkish male television actors
Turkish male stage actors
Local politicians in Turkey
Burials at Zincirlikuyu Cemetery